Kuwait has experienced several terror attacks, including those carried out by Al-Qaeda and other acts of Islamic terrorism. Some terror attacks in Kuwait were associated with the Gulf War and the subsequent American military support in Kuwait.

1970s
1974 attack on the Japanese Embassy in Kuwait
 June 17, 1976: The Al-Anba newspaper building was bombed. editorial offices were destroyed. Five people, including the editor-in-chief, were wounded.

1980s
December 1983 - 1983 Kuwait Bombing were attacks on six key foreign and Kuwaiti installations.
May 1985 - A failed assassination attempt was made on Sheikh Jaber Al-Sabah, who was the emir of Kuwait at the time. 
1984-1988 Aircraft hijackings

1990s
Several terror attacks associated with the Gulf War and an assassination attempt on actor Abdulhussain Abdulredha for an anti-Iraq theatrical play.

2000s
October 8, 2002 - Faylaka Island attack, in which two Kuwaiti citizens with ties to jihadists in Afghanistan attacked a group of unarmed United States Marines conducting a training exercise on a Kuwaiti island, killing one before being killed themselves.
October 10, 2002 - Two gunmen with ties to Al-Qaeda open fire on an American Humvee.
November 21, 2002 - Two American contractors with Tapestry Corporation were wounded while driving a civilian vehicle when a Kuwaiti police sergeant opened fire at them at close range.
January 31, 2005 - Kuwait Police infiltrate a terrorist cell belonging to the Peninsula Lions in a Salmiya apartment complex.  Five terrorist members and a civilian bystander were killed.
August 11, 2009 - Kuwaiti authorities reported that they had arrested six individuals accused of planning attacks on U.S. troops stationed at Camp Arifjan. The six men allegedly belong to a terrorist group with ties to Al-Qaeda.

2010s
June 26, 2015 - 2015 Kuwait mosque bombing - A bombing occurred during Friday prayer at masjid Imam al-Sadeq when a man was seen on surveillance cameras rushing into the masjid and then detonating himself. 27 people killed with 227 injured. ISIS has claimed responsibility for the bombing.

2017 - No terrorist incidents were reported in Kuwait in 2017, despite various attempts by ISIS.

References

 
Kuwait
Human rights abuses in Kuwait